is a Japanese professional golfer.

Higaki plays on the Japan Golf Tour, where he has won once.

Professional wins (1)

Japan Golf Tour wins (1)

Japan Golf Tour playoff record (0–3)

Team appearances
Dunhill Cup (representing Japan): 1997

External links

Japanese male golfers
Japan Golf Tour golfers
Sportspeople from Osaka Prefecture
1971 births
Living people